The Eski Mosque ("Old mosque")  was built in 1532 and reconstructed 1751 and 2008 in the city of Kumanovo, North Macedonia, at a time when North Macedonia was a part of the Ottoman Empire. In recent years there has been reconstruction work inside and outside the mosque.

See also
Macedonian Muslims
Muftiship of Kumanovo
Islam in North Macedonia
Islamic Religious Community of Macedonia

References

External links
Gallery of mosques in Kumanovo area including Eski Mosque.

Ottoman mosques in North Macedonia
Buildings and structures in Kumanovo
1532 establishments in the Ottoman Empire
Religious buildings and structures completed in 1532